The Supreme Court of the United States handed down six per curiam opinions during its 2004 term, which began October 4, 2004 and concluded October 3, 2005.

Because per curiam decisions are issued from the Court as an institution, these opinions all lack the attribution of authorship or joining votes to specific justices. All justices on the Court at the time the decision was handed down are assumed to have participated and concurred unless otherwise noted.

Court membership

Chief Justice: William Rehnquist

Associate Justices: John Paul Stevens, Sandra Day O'Connor, Antonin Scalia, Anthony Kennedy, David Souter, Clarence Thomas, Ruth Bader Ginsburg, Stephen Breyer

Smith v. Texas

San Diego v. Roe

Brosseau v. Haugen

Howell v. Mississippi

Bell v. Cone

Medellín v. Dretke

See also 
 List of United States Supreme Court cases, volume 543
 List of United States Supreme Court cases, volume 544

References

 

United States Supreme Court per curiam opinions
Lists of 2004 term United States Supreme Court opinions
2004 per curiam